The Kölner Werkschulen  (Cologne Academy of Fine and Applied Arts), formerly Cologne Art and Craft Schools, was a university  in Cologne training artists in visual arts, architecture and design from 1926 to 1971.

History

Origins
The origins of the Kölner Werkschulen can be found in the Sunday school established by the painter Egidius Mengelberg in 1822 at the Jesuit buildings. This was incorporated into the "Royal Prussian Provincial Vocational School Cologne" founded in 1833. In 1910 Emil Thormählen came to Cologne to develop a School of Applied Arts as part of the German Werkbund movement. However his plans to build a new school building had to be postponed due to the outbreak of war in 1914. When the plans could not be taken forward immediately after the war, Thormählen retired November 1919. In April 1924, the architect Martin Elsaesser was the director of the school and designed  a "Red House", an expressionist, red brick building on Ubierring 40.

1926–1933
In 1926 the school was reorganized and the Mayor Konrad Adenauer, designated it the "Cologne Werkschulen", in accordance with the Bauhaus point of view. He said, "Bonn is for science (= University) and Dusseldorf for Art (= Academy) but in Cologne I want both." Adenauer got his way by 1919 with the University of Cologne, and in 1924 with his Cologne art school (Werkschulen), with both buildings almost within sight of each other.

1933–1945
Under the rule of the NSDAP the German Werkbund movement was dissolved and the name of the Werkschulen was changed to Kölner Meisterschule (Cologne Master School). The new director Karl Berthold introduced the anti-semitic ideology of Hitler.

After 1946

Structure in 1971

Directors 
 1879–1906: Friedrich Romberg, engineer
 1906–1910: Gustav Halmhuber, architect and painter
 1910–1919, Emil Thormählen, painter and architect
 1920–1926: Martin Elsässer, architect
 1926–1931: Richard Riemerschmid, painter, architect and designer
 1931–1933: Karl With, art historian
 1933–1945: Karl Berthold, goldsmith
 1946–1957: August Hoff, art historian
 1958–1965: Friedrich Vordemberge, painter
 1965–1971: Werner Schriefers, painter and designer

Lecturers

Architecture and interior design 
Martin Elsaesser (1920–1925)
Dominikus Böhm (1926–1934/1947–1953)
Richard Riemerschmid (1926–1931)
Stefan Leuer (1954–1978)
Georg Lünenborg (1948–1967)
Gernot Lucas (1969–2003)
Wolf Nöhren (1970–1973)

Painting 
Johan Thorn Prikker (1926–1932)
Friedrich Ahlers-Hestermann (1928–1933)
Richard Seewald (1924–1931)
Otto Gerster (1939–1972)
Stefan Wewerka (1975–1993)
Daniel Spoerri (1978–1982)
Hans Rolf Maria Koller (1963–1973)
Dieter Kraemer (1963–1993)
Friedrich Vordemberge (1946–1976)
Dieter Horký (1971–1993)
Karl Marx (1959–1986)
Wilhelm Teuwen (1946–1967)
Elisabeth Vary (1964–1970–1993)
Werner Schriefers (1965–1989)
Gerhard Kadow (1967–1974)
Franz Dank (1961–1993)
Hubert Schaffmeister (1952–1976)

Sculpture and plastic arts 
Anton Berger (1964–1989)
Hans Karl Burgeff (1968–1988)
Ludwig Gies (1950–1962)
Georg Grasegger (1901–1927)
Josef Jaekel (1947–1975)
Dorkas Reinacher-Härlin (1924–1929)
Titus Reinarz (1981–1992)
Kurt Schwippert (1963–1968)
Wolfgang Wallner (1912–1950)
Hans Wissel (1925–1933)

Graphic design 
Richard Riemerschmid (1926–1931)
Jakob Erbar (1926–1933)
Heinrich Hußmann (1928–1965)
Alfred Will (1929–1933/1946–1971)
Anton Wolff (1942–1976)
Jürgen Klauke (1970–1975)
Heinz Edelmann (1976–1978)

Goldsmithing 
Ernst Riegel (1913–1933)
Elisabeth Treskow (1948–1964)

Photography 
Arno Jansen (1965–2003)

Art history 
Wilhelm Lotz
Karl With (1925–1928/1931–1933)
August Hoff (1946–1957)

Ceramics and industrial design 
 Dorkas Reinacher-Härlin (1924–1929)
 Ludwig König (1930–1933)
 Georg Roth (1924–1964)
 Walter Maria Kersting (1927–1932)
 Herbert Schultes (1968–1970)

Guest lecturers 
Bazon Brock (art theory)
Birgit Hein (film)
Wulf Herzogenrath (art settlement)
Friedrich Wolfram Heubach (psychology)
Jörg Immendorff (painting)
Leo Kofler (sociology)
Ingo Kümmel (art dealing)
Ulrike Rosenbach (video action)
Günter Karl Friedrich Schwichtenberg (cybernetics)

Students

Architecture 
Heinz Bienefeld
Johannes Krahn

Painting 
Ingeborg Drews
Hellmuth Eichner
Joseph Fassbender
Edvard Frank
Jürgen Hans Grümmer
Hildegard Grunert
Dieter Horký
Ulla Horký
Ida Köhne
Jean Lessenich
Joseph Mader
Wolfgang Niedecken
Erwin und Helmut Plönes
Anton Räderscheidt
Wolfgang Schulte
Franz Wilhelm Seiwert
Udo Sellbach
Wolfgang Siemens
Helga Tiemann
Rosemarie Trockel
Günther Umberg
Kurt Wegner
Willy Weyres
Paul Wieghardt

Sculpture / plastic arts 
Georg J. Ahrens
Raimund Böll
Kurt-Wolf von Borries
Hilde Broër
Hubert Bruhs
Heinz Feuerborn
Peter Raacke
Titus Reinarz
Wolfgang Reuter
Ulrich Rückriem
Gretel Schulte-Hostedde

Graphic design 
Will Burtin
Thomas F. Fischer
Walter Hanel
Jürgen Klauke
Maurilio Minuzzi
Eduard Prüssen
Maf Räderscheidt
Konrad Schaefer
Helmut Tollmann

Photography 
Chargesheimer
Fritz Gruber
Candida Höfer
Burkhard Jüttner
Raoul Ubac

References 

Defunct universities and colleges in Germany
Art schools in Germany
Education in Cologne
1926 establishments in Germany
Educational institutions established in 1926
Educational institutions disestablished in 1971
1971 disestablishments in West Germany